Montgomery Pittman (March 1, 1920 – June 26, 1962) was a television writer, director, and actor. Among his notable credits are his work writing and directing various episodes of The Twilight Zone, Maverick and 77 Sunset Strip.

Early years

According to his own account in the 1950's, Pittman was born in Louisiana in 1917 and reared in Arkansas. Both the birth year and birthplace are false; he was actually born March 1, 1920, in Oklahoma. There are no verifiable contemporary sources to show that he ever lived in either Arkansas or Louisiana.

Born Montgomery Cherlez Pittman in Waldon Township, Grady County, Oklahoma, he was the son of John Griffin Pittman, a tenant farmer, and Mary Belle Pittman. (The US Census taker for 1920 had visited the family on February 3 of that year, hence his absence from that record). His parents and older siblings had all been born in Arkansas. As a teenager he was known as "Marty"; he was closest with his brother Graylon H. Pittman, known as "Smokey" who became a vaudeville performer in the southern and southwestern U.S.

From 1935 thru 1940 Pittman lived in Oklahoma City with his married sister Myrtle, who went by the name "Johnnie", and her husband Jesse Brogdon. According to the 1940 Census he had been out of work for the previous year. During September 1940 Pittman enlisted in the Oklahoma National Guard, and was assigned as a private to a field artillery unit. His occupation was listed as "unskilled amusement, recreation, and motion picture backgrounds" and his education as "Grammar School". He was listed as being 5' 11" (180.3 cm) tall and weighed 150 pounds (68 kg). There is no further public information about his enlistment.

When registering for the draft on December 8, 1941, Pittman said he was not employed, gave his correct birthdate and listed his sister's address in Oklahoma City as a contact, but for the first time gave his birthplace as New Orleans, Louisiana. He also handwrote a new address in Albuquerque, New Mexico, on the card, indicating he had left Oklahoma City where the draft board was located. The draft registrar recorded him as having brown hair, brown eyes, light complexion, and found he now weighed 175 pounds (79 kg).

Career 

Again, according to his own account, Pittman left home and joined a carnival as a snake oil salesman. He eventually made his way to New York City, hoping for at least a small Broadway role. There he met actor Steve Cochran, who hired him as caretaker of his Los Angeles home around 1950.

In Los Angeles he tried to break into acting, getting small, mostly uncredited film and TV roles through 1951 and '52. Around this time, Cochran introduced Pittman to Maurita Gilbert Jackson, the widowed mother of three child actors: Curtis, Jr., Gary, and Sherry Jackson. A romance developed, and in 1952 Pittman married Maurita Jackson in a small ceremony on June 4 in Torrance, California, with Sherry serving as flower girl and younger brother Gary as ring-bearer; Cochran himself was Pittman's best man. Approximately a year later, stepdaughter Sherry would land the role of Terry Williams on the sitcom Make Room For Daddy, which would last for five years and give her a measure of stardom.

By 1954, Pittman had turned from acting to screenwriting, sometimes writing material in which he could play small guest roles. He began with anthology shows such as Four Star Playhouse and Schlitz Playhouse, and at that time was billed as Monte Pittman.

In 1955 Cochran hired Pittman to write his next film, Come Next Spring, the first that Cochran produced himself. Sherry played the part of Cochran's mute daughter Annie Ballot, a role Pittman wrote specifically for his step-daughter.

By this point, Pittman's writing career moved into higher gear, as he started working as a writer for ABC/Warner Brothers TV shows such as 77 Sunset Strip, Sugarfoot, Maverick, Cheyenne, Surfside 6, and Colt .45. He also wrote for NBC's The Deputy, and CBS's The Twilight Zone.

By 1958 (and now consistently billed as Montgomery Pittman) he had also branched into directing for television, in addition to continuing his work as a writer and actor. Pittman often directed his own scripts, as well as scripts by other writers.

Pittman frequently cast his stepdaughter Sherry Jackson in television episodes he wrote and/or directed. Jackson appeared in episodes of 77 Sunset Strip, The Rifleman, Surfside 6 and The Twilight Zone that were both written and directed by Pittman, as well as episodes of Maverick and Riverboat that Pittman wrote but did not direct.

Montgomery and Maurita's son, Robert John Pittman, was born in 1956. Robert John also had a brief career as a child actor, debuting on a Montgomery Pittman-directed episode of 77 Sunset Strip in 1960 before settling into a recurring role on Dennis The Menace as Dennis' friend Seymour Williams.

Although he continued his occasional acting career, Pittman himself never appeared as an actor in a TV episode he directed.

Pittman is interred at Forest Lawn Memorial Park in the Hollywood Hills.

See also
Sherry Jackson

References

Sources
Zicree, Marc Scott: The Twilight Zone Companion. Sillman-James Press, 1989 (third edition)

External links

1917 births
1962 deaths
American television writers
American male television writers
American television directors
American male television actors
Deaths from cancer in California
People from Louisiana
People from Los Angeles
20th-century American male actors
Burials at Forest Lawn Memorial Park (Hollywood Hills)
Screenwriters from California
20th-century American screenwriters
20th-century American male writers